The 1985 Cork Senior Hurling Championship was the 97th staging of the Cork Senior Hurling Championship since its establishment by the Cork County Board in 1887. The championship began on 4 May 1985 and ended on 29 September 1985.

St. Finbarr's entered the championship as the defending champions, however, they were beaten by Carbery in the second round.

The final was played on 29 September 1985 at Páirc Uí Chaoimh in Cork, between Blackrock and Midleton, in what was their first meeting in the final in 70 years. Blackrock won the match by 1-14 to 1-08 to claim their 29th championship title overall and a first title in six years.

Blackrock's Finbarr Delaney was the championship's top scorer with 3-22.

Team changes

To Championship

Promoted from the Cork Intermediate Hurling Championship
 Erin's Own

From Championship

Regraded to the Cork Intermediate Hurling Championship
 Nemo Rangers

Results

First round

Second round

Quarter-finals

Semi-finals

Final

Championship statistics

Top scorers

Top scorers overall

Top scorers in a single game

Miscellaneous

 Milford qualified for the semi-final stage of the championship for the first time in their history.

References

Cork Senior Hurling Championship
Cork Senior Hurling Championship